ENAD Ayiou Dometiou FC is a Cypriot football club based in Ayios Dhometios, Nicosia. Founded in 1957, it played in the second, third and fourth divisions. The team dissolved after 1993 and reactive at 2013. The team is part of the sports club ENAD Ayiou Dometiou.

References

Football clubs in Cyprus
Association football clubs established in 1937
1937 establishments in Cyprus